Pelican Park was a sports stadium in New Orleans, Louisiana from 1908 to 1914. The ballpark was bound by South Carrollton Avenue, Palmyra Street, Banks Street and Scott Street. A contest was conducted to name the new ballpark. "Pelican Park" won out over scores of other entries.

When Pelican Park was demolished in 1914, the park's wooden grandstand was disassembled and relocated several blocks down Carrollton Avenue by mules to the intersection of Carrollton Avenue and Tulane Avenue. It reopened on April 13, 1915, as Pelican Stadium.

It was home to the New Orleans Pelicans baseball organization from 1908 to 1914.

See also
New Orleans Pelicans (baseball)
Sports in New Orleans

External links
Sanborn map showing Pelican Park, 1908

References

New Orleans Pelicans (baseball) stadiums
Baseball venues in New Orleans
Defunct baseball venues in the United States
Defunct minor league baseball venues
Defunct sports venues in New Orleans
Demolished sports venues in Louisiana
Sports venues demolished in 1914